Rabe may refer to:

Places
 Rabe, Lesko County, in Subcarpathian Voivodeship (south-east Poland)
 Rabe, Bieszczady County. in Subcarpathian Voivodeship (south-east Poland)
 Rabe (Novi Kneževac), a village in Serbia
 Rabe (crater), on Mars
 1624 Rabe, an asteroid
 Rabé de las Calzadas, village in Burgos, Castilla-León, Spain

Other uses
 Rabe (surname)
 Broccoli rabe or rapini, a green cruciferous vegetable
 Radio RaBe, a non-commercial community radio station in Berne, Switzerland

See also
 Raabe, surname

fr:Corbeau (oiseau)